Aq Dagesh-e Olya (also Romanized as Āq Dagesh-e ‘Olyā; also known as Āq Dagesh-e Bālā, Āq Dagesh, and Āq Gash-e Bālā) is a village in Mazraeh-ye Jonubi Rural District, Voshmgir District, Aqqala County, Golestan Province, Iran. At the 2006 census, its population was 1,010, in 204 families.

References 

Populated places in Aqqala County